Heilprin Glacier, is a glacier in northwestern Greenland. Administratively it belongs to the Avannaata municipality.

This glacier was named by Robert Peary after geologist, paleontologist and naturalist Angelo Heilprin (1853 – 1907), curator of the Philadelphia Academy of Natural Sciences, who took part in the Peary expedition to Greenland of 1891–92.

Geography 
The Heilprin Glacier discharges from the Greenland Ice Sheet into the head of the Inglefield Fjord just east of the Harvard Islands and northeast of Quajaqqisaarsuaq. Its terminus lies between the Smithson Range nunatak that separates it from the Tracy Glacier to the north, and Nunatarsuaq, a plateau dotted with lakes to the south.

Although the Heilprin Glacier is contiguous to the Tracy Glacier, both glaciers have a different nature, a fact which has been a source of puzzlement for scientists for over a century.

See also
List of glaciers in Greenland
Inglefield Fjord

References

External links
NASA - Decline of Two Glaciers in Northwest Greenland
Identifying Spatial Variability in Greenland's Outlet Glacier Response to Ocean Heat
The recent regimen of the ice cap margin in North Greenland
Glaciers of Greenland